The Zimbabwe women's cricket team were scheduled to play the Ireland women's cricket team in July 2019. It would have been the first time that the Zimbabwe women's team will tour Ireland. However, in June 2019, the tour was cancelled 48 hours before it was due to take place, due to a funding issue from Zimbabwe Cricket. Warren Deutrom, the CEO of Cricket Ireland, expressed his disappointment at the late cancellation, but made alternative arrangements for the Ireland women's team ahead of the 2019 ICC Women's World Twenty20 Qualifier tournament.

The tour was scheduled to consist of three 50-over matches and three Women's Twenty20 Internationals (WT20Is). The WT20Is would have taken place on the same days and venues as the corresponding men's fixtures. Prior to the cancellation by Zimbabwe, Cricket Ireland had also considered cancelling both of the tours, following poor ticket sales for international matches earlier in the season, but the International Cricket Council (ICC) provided a US $500,000 bailout.

Zimbabwe women were also scheduled to travel to the Netherlands following this series, to play four WT20I against the Netherlands women's cricket team, but that tour was also cancelled for the same reason. In July 2019, the International Cricket Council (ICC) suspended Zimbabwe Cricket, with the team barred from taking part in ICC events.

Squads

Ahead of the tour, Kim Garth was ruled out of Ireland's squad due to an injury and was replaced by Hannah Little.

References

External links
 Series home at ESPN Cricinfo

2019 in Zimbabwean cricket
2019 in Irish cricket
International cricket competitions in 2019
cricket
2019 in women's cricket